The Bad Man is a 1930 American Pre-Code Western film starring Walter Huston which was produced and released by First National Pictures, a subsidiary of Warner Bros. The movie is based on Porter Emerson Browne's 1920 play of the same name and is a sound remake of the 1923 silent version of the same name. The film stars Walter Huston and features Dorothy Revier, Sidney Blackmer and James Rennie.

Plot
Walter Huston plays the part of a notorious Mexican bandit. James Rennie plays as the man who once saved his life. When Rennie is unable to pay the mortgage on his ranch and is in risk of losing everything, Huston determines to help him. Sidney Blackmer, who has reason to believe that there is oil on Rennie's property, attempts to swindle Rennie and buy the property from him for a low price. Huston soon discovers that Rennie is in love with Blackmer's wife, played by Dorothy Revier, and consequently has Blackmer shot so that they can pursue their romance. Huston then robs a bank and uses the money to pay off Rennie's mortgage. Having the ranch securely in his hands, Rennie is now free to marry Revier. As Huston says goodbye to the couple, he is overtaken by the Texas Rangers and shot.

Preservation
An incomplete nitrate print of this film—8 of 9 reels—survives in the UCLA Film and Television Archive. The entire film is in danger of being lost, however, if the film is still not preserved as of January 2021 or at some point the near future. The film may have already begun to decompose since it was last reported in 2007.

Original version and remake
The film, based on a 1920 play, was originally filmed in 1923 with Holbrook Blinn, who had originated the role in the 1920 Broadway production which ran for a whopping 342 performances. The film was remade in 1940 as The Bad Man with Wallace Beery as Pancho Lopez and a supporting cast including Lionel Barrymore, Laraine Day, and Ronald Reagan.

Foreign-language versions
Two foreign-language versions of the 1930 version of The Bad Man were made. The Spanish version was titled El hombre malo, while the French version was titled Lopez, le bandit.

Cast
Walter Huston as Pancho Lopez
Dorothy Revier as Ruth Pell
James Rennie as Gilbert Jones
O. P. Heggie as Henry Taylor
Sidney Blackmer as Morgan Pell
Marion Byron as Angela Hardy
Guinn 'Big Boy' Williams as Red Giddings
Arthur Stone as Pedro
Edward Lynch as Bradley
Harry Semels as Jose
Erville Alderson as Hardy

References

External links 
 
 

1930 films
First National Pictures films
Films directed by Clarence G. Badger
1930 Western (genre) films
1930s English-language films
Warner Bros. films
Films with screenplays by Howard Estabrook
American black-and-white films
American Western (genre) films
Films produced by Robert North
1930s American films